The 1972 Baylor Bears football team represented the Baylor University in the 1972 NCAA University Division football season. Grant Teaff was hired to resurrect the moribund football team at Baylor. Baylor originally hired Rudy Feldman from New Mexico, but Feldman quit after one day, leaving the job to Teaff. Baylor had been 7–43–1 in the five seasons preceding Teaff's arrival. The Bears offense scored 180 points, while the Bears defense allowed 156 points. In the Battle of the Brazos, the Bears beat Texas A&M by a score of 15–13.

Schedule

References

Baylor
Baylor Bears football seasons
Baylor Bears football